Acetobacter aceti is a Gram-negative bacterium that moves using its peritrichous flagella. Louis Pasteur proved it to be the cause of conversion of ethanol to acetic acid in 1864. It is a benign microorganism which is present everywhere in the environment, existing in alcoholic ecological niches which include flowers, fruits, and honey bees, as well as in water and soil. It lives wherever sugar fermentation occurs. It grows best in temperatures that range from 25 to 30 degrees Celsius and in pH that ranges from 5.4 to 6.3. For a long time it has been used in the fermentation industry to produce acetic acid from alcohol. Acetobacter aceti is an obligate aerobe, which means that it requires oxygen to grow.

Acetobacter aceti is economically important because it is used in the production of vinegar by converting the ethanol in wine or cider into acetic acid. The acetic acid created by A. aceti is also used in the manufacturing of acetate rayon, plastics production, rubber production, and photographic chemicals. A. aceti is considered an acidophile, which means it is able to survive in acidic environments, due to having an acidified cytoplasm which makes nearly all proteins in the genome to evolve acid stability. A. aceti has become important in helping to understand the process by which proteins can attain acid stability.

Industrial use

Acetic acid production 
A. aceti  is used for the mass production of acetic acid, the main component in vinegar. During the fermentation process of vinegar production, it is used to act on wines and ciders resulting in vinegar with acetic acid. It can be converted by a silicone tube reactor, which aids the fermentation process with oxidation.

Safety 
A. aceti has not been reported as a human pathogen. Human skin does not provide the bacteria with the optimal conditions for it to grow, which makes it safe to handle in factories that use the species to produce acetic acid. However, some evidence indicates it can be harmful to plants and other flora, though it exists naturally in the world.

Growth
Oxidation is used to stimulate the growth of the A. aceti. Samples of the bacteria are placed in a few silicone tubes. These tubes are permeable to oxygen, after which they are left in a region warmer than the typical room temperature and cultured.

Pink disease in pineapples
Because A. aceti occurs naturally and is widespread in the world, so far,  no evidence shows it is a threat to humans, but in recent studies, it has been suspected to cause some detrimental effects on pineapples. The pink disease in pineapples causes the fruit to turn a slight pink color, only to eventually become brown and then rot. Similar experiments have also been tested on other fruits such as apples and pears and results end with rotten fruits. However, the bacterium seems to only be effective if the fruit has any locations exposing its flesh and the temperature surrounding its invasion is warmer than average. With the discovery of other Acetobacter species, skepticism exists regarding A. aceti being the only cause of the pink discoloration disease in pineapples. Studies are still being conducted on other species on the genus Acetobacter because 15 other species have been found in rotting fruits, as well.

References

External links 
Type strain of Acetobacter aceti at BacDive -  the Bacterial Diversity Metadatabase

Rhodospirillales
Bacteria described in 1898